P S Jayhari is an Indian music composer who predominantly work in Malayalam Movie Industry. He is known for composing songs for the movies Athiran, Pidikittapulli, 18 hours, Kadakalam, Kochal etc. He is also known for scoring the documentary Chembai: My Discovery of a Legend which got special mention in National Film Awards in 2017.

Filmography

Awards and recognition

References

Indian film score composers
Living people
Indian male composers
Musicians from Kochi
Film musicians from Kerala
Year of birth missing (living people)